CISF-FM is an English-language radio station which broadcasts a combined adult contemporary/community radio format on the frequency of 107.7 MHz in Surrey, British Columbia, Canada.

The new station is based in the Surrey town centre of Cloverdale and is owned by South Fraser Broadcasting Inc. (a different company from the similarly named South Fraser Broadcasting which once owned CISL and CKZZ-FM).

Approval from the CRTC was made on August 6, 2014. The station is licensed to broadcast with an effective radiated power of 2500 watts (with an effective height of antenna above average terrain of 132.4 metres). The station began testing on December 18, 2015.

In addition to music, the station broadcasts local news and other spoken word content targeted at Surrey's diverse population.

Current lineup 
 Rudy Parachoniak (2020–present)
 Tara Lopez (2016–present)
 Neil Morrison (2016–present)
 Leslie and Hollywood Harv (Leslie Stein and Harv Puni) (March 2022 – present)

Paid Programming 
CISF offers locally produced paid programming.

 'Radio Real Estate' with Tom Lucas (2017–Present)

References

External links
Pulse FM 107.7 
CRTC Archive
CISF-FM history - Canadian Communication Foundation

ISF
Surrey, British Columbia
ISF